Acragas miniaceus is a species of jumping spider in the genus Acragas. The scientific name of this species was first published in 1900 by simon. These spiders are  found in Peru and Brazil.

References

External links 

miniaceus
Spiders of South America
Fauna of Brazil
Fauna of Peru
Spiders described in 1900